Lucie Cadiès (married name was Verdy) (born 1898) was a French athlete, who specialized in the middle distance races.  Champion of France in the 1,000 m in 1918, she beat the  World record in the 1000 meters. Her record is not yet recognized as such by the International Association of Athletics Federations which began to ratify female records for the 1 000 meters in 1922 with the time of Georgette Lenoir.

Biography

Records

Notes and references  

1898 births
Year of death missing
French female middle-distance runners